La Côte Basque was a New York City restaurant. It opened in the late 1950s and operated until it closed on March 7, 2004. In business for 45 years, upon its closing The New York Times called it a "former high-society temple of French cuisine at 60 West 55th Street."

History
The restaurant was opened in the late 1950s by Henri Soulé. Jean-Jacques Rachou became the owner and chef in 1979.  At that time the restaurant was located a block to the east, moving to the West 55th street location in 1995. It was "known as much for its elegantly arrayed tables, set against a backdrop of handsome French seaside murals, as for its food. Mr. Rachou said he spent more than $2,200 a week on flowers and more than $3,000 on linen."

Truman Capote's unfinished novel Answered Prayers had as its setting a "catty and thinly veiled" version of the La Côte Basque; the chapter "La Côte Basque 1965" was excerpted in Esquire magazine in 1975. A scene from the film Light Sleeper (1992), directed by Paul Schrader, features Willem Dafoe and Susan Sarandon eating lunch in the restaurant.

Famous patrons included Jacqueline Kennedy Onassis, Babe Paley, Nan Kempner, Frank Sinatra, Freddie Carucci and Dave Feeback.

The restaurant is also mentioned in Sex and the City, when Charlotte's future-mother-in-law Bunny suggests it over Cloche for dinner.

External links

References

French-American culture in New York City
Defunct restaurants in New York City
Restaurants established in 1959
Restaurants disestablished in 2004
1959 establishments in New York City
2004 disestablishments in New York (state)
Midtown Manhattan
Defunct French restaurants in the United States